Ayaz Ata is a winter god and a fictional tale character that it represents who in some Turkic cultures plays a role similar to that of Santa Claus or Ded Moroz. The literal translation of the name would be "Frost Father", although the name is often translated as "Grandfather Frost". He was created of Moon light and caused by cold weather.

Features
Literary depictions of Ayaz Ata commonly show him accompanied by Kar Kız (Tatar: Кар Кызы or Qar Qızı means "Snow Girl" or "Snow Maiden"), his granddaughter and helper, sometimes with influence of Slavic Snegurochka, who often depicted in long silver-blue robes and a furry cap or a snowflake-like crown. She is a unique attribute of Ayaz Ata; no traditional gift-givers from other cultures are portrayed with a similar companion.

The traditional appearance of Ayaz Ata resembles that of Ded Moroz, with his coat, boots and long white beard. Specifically, Ayaz Ata is often shown wearing a heel-length fur coat, a semi-round fur hat, and valenki or jackboots on his feet. Unlike Santa Claus, he is often depicted as walking with a long magical staff. He is often depicted in long silver-blue robes and a snowflake-like crown.

In Azerbaijan
In Azerbaijani, Ayaz Ata is known as Şaxta Baba ("Grandfather Frost") and his companion grandchild is known as Qar Qızı ("Snow Girl"). Şaxta Baba brings gifts to children at New Year celebrations, however Qar Qızı is rarely present at the festivities.

In Bashkortostan
In Bashkir, Ayaz Ata is known as Ҡыш бабай (Qïš babay, literally: "Winter Father"), and his granddaughter is known as Ҡарһылыу (Qarhïlïw, "Snow beauty").

In Yakutia
Chys Khan (Sakha: Чысхаан, Turkish: Kış Han, "Winter King") is known as the master of cold, accompanied by the snow maiden Khaarchana (Sakha: Хаарчаана).

In Kazakhstan and Kyrgyzstan
Аяз Ата (Ayaz Ata) is the same Kazakh and Kyrgyz name.

References

External links 
 Russian Ded Moroz and Kyrgyz Ayaz Ata 
 Grandfather Frost

Turkic legendary creatures
Sky and weather gods

az:Şaxta Baba
azb:آیاز آتا
cv:Хĕл Мучи
hu:Télapó
mhr:Йӱштӧ Кугыза
uz:Ayoz Bobo
tt:Кыш бабай